Palazzo Pastore is a civil building located in Alcamo, in the province of Trapani.

Description 
It is one of the best-known and most beautiful palaces in Alcamo; in neoclassical style, it was built at the end of the 18th century by the baron Nicolò Pastore, the first baron of Rincione and the father of the more famous Felice Pastore, politician and benefactor.
Various noblemen and princes were hosted in this wonderful place over time. 

The building has three floors and three internal courts, one of them very large; the façade has some structural parts similar to those of the Mother Church and other palaces. The entrance leading to the two stairs is imposing: on the northern side there are eight columns made with red marble and a ceiling with ribs, with four round arches leading to the two stairs and to the main court.

On the northern wall of the staircase there is a plaque which commemorates the stay of His Majesty Ferdinand I of the Two Sicilies in 1799. There is another entrance from via Cernaia, with two rooms used as a gatehouse and a stairway leading to the first floor, where there are 12 rooms and other accessories that were the servants’ quarters at one time.

See also 
 Casa De Ballis
 Palazzo Rossotti-Chiarelli
 Villa Luisa (Alcamo)

References

Sources 
 Roberto Calia: I Palazzi dell'aristocrazia e della borghesia alcamese; Alcamo, Carrubba, 1997
 P.M. Rocca: di alcuni antichi edifici di Alcamo; Palermo, tip. Castellana-Di Stefano, 1905
 Giuseppe Polizzi: I monumenti di antichità e d'arte della provincia di Trapani; Trapani, Giovanni Modica Romano, 1879, p. 61

External links 
 
 

Buildings and structures in Alcamo
Buildings and structures completed in the 18th century
18th-century establishments in Italy
18th-century architecture in Italy